Demizu (written: 出水) is a Japanese surname. Notable people with the surname include:
, Japanese TBS announcer, television presenter and newscaster
, Japanese manga artist

Japanese-language surnames